The Cooper Canyon Formation is a geological formation of Norian age in Texas and New Mexico.

Type area of the formation is situated in Garza County, Texas. An equivalent formation in eastern New Mexico is named Bull Canyon Formation. Some researchers argue that the latter name should be abandoned.

The formation consist of reddish siltstone and mudstone with lenses of sandstone and conglomerate. Thickness of the formation in the type area is 161.5 meters. It increases to the south, and in some places exceeds 200 m. The formation contains diverse fossils, including vertebrate remains.

Vertebrate fauna

Temnospondyls

Allokotosaurs

Archosaurs and related

Procolophonomorphs

Misc.

See also
 List of dinosaur-bearing rock formations

References

Links
Bull Canyon Formation of Chinle Group by USGS

Triassic formations of New Mexico
Triassic geology of Texas
Norian Stage